Gļebs Kļuškins (born 1 October 1992) is a Latvian footballer, who  currently plays as a midfielder for Liepāja.

Club career

Early career
As a youth player Kļuškins was a member of the Rīgas FS youth system. He made his top flight debut for FK Daugava Rīga  at the age of 17 on 29 August 2009 coming as substitute against Skonto Riga. After spending two seasons at Rīgas FS and playing in Latvian First League, Kļuškins returns at top flight in 2012. His first goal in Latvian Higher League comes on September 30, 2012 against FC Jurmala when Kļuškins scores match winner 3-2 on 84th minute coming as substitute eight minutes earlier.

FK Jelgava
Kļuškins joined FK Jelgava in March 2015 only one week before the first game of the season. Soon he established himself as a regular starter in the team squad. Kļuškins most remarkable moment of the season came on July 16 when he scored the only goal on 87.minute in FK Jelgava 1-0 win of 2015–16 UEFA Europa League second qualifying round first leg game against Macedonian side FK Rabotnički.

International career
Gļebs Kļuškins first call-up to the senior Latvia national team squad came in May 2013 for the International friendly match against Qatar and he made his national team debut coming as substitute on 75th minute playing away game in Doha on 24 May 2013. His next call came three years later when head coach Marians Pahars on 23 August 2016 selected Gļebs Kļuškins in the squad  for friendly game against the Luxembourg and World Cup qualifiers match against Andorra.

International goals
Scores and results list Latvia's goal tally first.

Career statistics

Honours
FK Jelgava
Latvian Football Cup (2): 2014–15, 2015–16

Individual
 Best player of 2016 Latvian Higher League

References

External links
 

1992 births
Living people
Latvian footballers
Latvian expatriate footballers
Association football midfielders
Latvia international footballers
FK Jelgava players
FK RFS players
FK Sūduva Marijampolė players
FK Metta players
FK Liepāja players
Latvian expatriate sportspeople in Lithuania
Expatriate footballers in Lithuania